Sky Trails is David Crosby's sixth solo album, released on September 29, 2017, by BMG Music. It is Crosby's third album in less than four years, whereas his first three solo albums appeared over a span of 22 years. Musicians on the album derive in part from Crosby's various 21st Century collaborations. Producer James Raymond and Jeff Pevar were Crosby's bandmates in CPR; Andrew Ford and Steve DiStanislao were respectively that band's touring bassist and drummer. Michael League of Snarky Puppy and Becca Stevens had appeared on Crosby's previous album, and Dean Parks had played on the 2004 album Crosby did with long-time partner Graham Nash.

Track listing

Personnel 
 David Crosby — vocals, acoustic guitar (10)
 James Raymond – acoustic piano (1, 3, 4, 6, 7, 10), electric piano (1, 3, 5, 6), synthesizers (1-5, 7, 10), synth bass (1, 3, 7), horn arrangements (1), drum programming (3, 6), vocoder (5, 9), all other instruments (9), backing vocals (9), acoustic guitar (10), percussion (10)
 Dean Parks – electric guitar (1, 6)
 Becca Stevens – acoustic guitars (2), vocals (2)
 Jeff Pevar – electric guitar (3)
 Greg Leisz – pedal steel guitar (3, 6, 7)
 Steve Postell – acoustic guitar (6)
 Mai Agan – bass (2, 4, 5, 10), backing vocals (5)
 Andrew Ford – bass (6)
 Steve DiStanislao – drums (1, 3, 5, 6)
 Gary Novak – drums (9)
 Steve Tavaglione – tenor saxophone (1), soprano saxophone (2, 5, 6), EWI (5, 6), alto flute (9)
 Walt Fowler – flugelhorn (1)
 Jacob Collier – backing vocals (1)

Instruments on "Somebody Home"
 Snarky Puppy:
 Bill Laurance – acoustic piano
 Justin Stanton – electric piano
 Shaun Martin – synthesizers
 Cory Henry – organ
 Bob Lanzetti – guitar 
 Mark Lettieri – guitar 
 Chris McQueen – guitar
 Michael League – bass
 Robert "Sput" Searight – drums
 Nate Werth – percussion
 Jeff Coffin – alto saxophone, flute
 Chris Bullock – tenor saxophone
 Jay Jennings – flugelhorn
 Mike "Maz" Maher – flugelhorn

Production 
 James Raymond – producer, recording (1-7, 9, 10)
 Dan Garcia – recording (1-7, 9, 10), mixing 
 Andre Maaker – bass recording (4)
 Eric Hartman – recording (8)
 Meelis Tinno – bass recording (10)
 Joel Jacks – assistant engineer
 Bill Lang – assistant engineer 
 Rich Tosi – assistant engineer
 Ed Wong – assistant engineer 
 Nate Haze – mix assistant 
 Bernie Grundman – mastering 
 Emilia Canas Mendes – artwork 
 Jeffrey Parrish – photography 
 Bamboo Studios – photography
 Mike Chadwick – management 

Studios
 Recorded at The Bamboom Room (Altadena, CA); Groove Masters (Santa Monica, CA); Rumor Mill Recording (Santa Ynez, CA); Sunset Sound (Hollywood, CA); Esplenade Studios (New Orleans, LA); Amaja Studio and Tuhalaane Studio (Estonia).
 Mixed at Sunset Sound
 Mastered at Bernie Grundman Mastering (Hollywood, CA).

References

2017 albums
David Crosby albums